Cork University Hospital is a large university teaching hospital in Wilton, Cork in Ireland. Its academic partner is University College Cork. It is the only Level 1 Trauma Centre in Ireland. It is a public hospital managed by the South/Southwest Hospital Group, a part of the Health Service Executive.

History
The hospital officially opened as Cork Regional Hospital in November 1978. A new Regional Cancer Centre opened in December 2009 and a new Cardiac Renal Centre, built at a cost of €85 million, opened in October 2010.

Services
The hospital has 800 beds. The hospital has its own hospital radio CUH FM offering full coverage to the hospital. The hospital also receives patients by helicopter: currently helicopters land on a purpose-built helipad at the facilities of Bishopstown G.A.A. and Highfield R.F.C. near to the hospital. In 2011 it was confirmed on 6 April 2011 that the hospital would receive a new helipad costing €1.5m and, after a lengthy site selection process, a planning application for the helipad was submitted in November 2018.

Transport
A number of Bus Éireann city bus routes serve the hospital, including routes 201 and 208 (from Mayfield), 214 (from St Patrick's Street), 216 (from Monkstown via Douglas), and 219 (from Mahon). In addition, a number of regional bus routes also serve the hospital, including some services on route 232 (from Ballincollig), routes 236, 237 and 239 (from West Cork). Since Spring 2020 West Cork Connect also serve the hospital on their route to/from West Cork.

See also
 Mallow General Hospital
 St. Mary's Health Campus

References

1978 establishments in Ireland
Buildings and structures in Cork (city)
Health Service Executive hospitals
Hospital buildings completed in 1978
Hospitals established in 1978
Hospitals in County Cork
20th-century architecture in the Republic of Ireland